The Austin Outlaws are a women's football team in the Women's Football Alliance.  They are based in Austin, Texas.  Home games are played at historic House Park in downtown Austin.

Founded in 2001 as a charter member of the Independent Women's Football League, the Outlaws finished 5–1, good enough for the first IWFL championship (playoffs were not held that year).

The following year of 2002, the Outlaws finished 7-2 and made the IWFL playoffs.  After defeating the Corvallis Pride in the qualifier, the Outlaws fell 24–4 to the New York Sharks in the championship game.

In 2003 the Outlaws moved to the National Women's Football Association, where they would spend their next six seasons.  That inaugural season was only as an exhibition team, and the Outlaws finished with a 1–1 record.

For 2004, the Outlaws became a full-time member of the NWFA.  Despite finishing with a 5–3 record (second place in the Southwest Division), the Outlaws missed the playoffs.

In 2005, the Outlaws again missed the playoffs, finishing at 4-4 and ninth place in the Southern Division.

2006 was the year the Outlaws returned to the postseason, finishing at 6-2 and second place in the South West Division.  However, their playoff exit was quick, losing 23–6 to the Chattanooga Locomotion in the first round.

2007 showed the Outlaws with another second-place finish in the Southern Conference West Division at 5–3.  That was again not good enough for the postseason.

In 2008, again the Outlaws finished 5-3 (for third place in the South Central Division this time), and again missed the postseason.  After the season, the Outlaws announced their move to the Women's Football Alliance.

The 2009 season brought a division championship back home to Austin.  With a record of 7–1, the Outlaws traveled to Jacksonville to play against the Dixie Blues.  Though the Outlaws were defeated, they remain proud that they beat the tough Lone Star Mustangs twice in order to earn that title.

Season-By-Season

|-
| colspan="6" align="center" | Austin Outlaws (IWFL)
|-
|2001 || 5 || 1 || 0 || 1st League || Declared IWFL Champions (based on regular season record)
|-
|2002 || 8 || 4 || 0 || 2nd Western Conference || Won Western Conference Championship (Corvallis)Lost IWFL Championship (New York)
|-
| colspan="6" align="center" | Austin Outlaws (NWFA)
|-
|2003 || 1 || 1 || 0 || X-Team || -- 
|-
|2004 || 5 || 3 || 0 || 2nd Southern Southwest || -- 
|-
|2005 || 4 || 4 || 0 || 9th Southern || -- 
|-
|2006 || 6 || 3 || 0 || 2nd Southern Southwest || Lost Southern Conference Quarterfinal (Chattanooga) 
|-
|2007 || 5 || 3 || 0 || 2nd Southern West || --
|-
|2008 || 5 || 3 || 0 || 3rd Southern Central || --
|-
| colspan="6" align="center" | Austin Outlaws (WFA)
|-
|2009 || 7 || 2 || 0 || 1st American Southwest || Lost American Conference Semifinal (Jacksonville)
|-
|2010 || 6 || 4 || 0 || 2nd American Southwest || Won American Conference Quarterfinal (Memphis)Lost American Conference Semifinal (Las Vegas)
|-
|2011 || 3 || 5 || 0 || 3rd American South Central || --
|-
|2012 || 1 || 7 || 0 || 4th American Southwest || --
|-
|2013 || 7 || 3 || 0 || 2nd American Southwest || Won American Conference Wild Card (Little Rock)Lost American Conference Quarterfinal (Dallas)
|-
|2014 || 8 || 2 || 0 || 1st American Southwest || Won American Conference Quarterfinal (Minnesota)Lost American Conference Semifinal (Kansas City)
|-
|2015 || 2 || 6 || 0 || 4th American Southwest || --
|-
|2016 || 1 || 7 || 0 || 2nd WFA3 American Midwest || --
|-
!Totals || 74 || 58 || 0

2010

Season schedules

2011

Standings

Season schedule

** = Won by forfeit

2012

Season schedule

References

External links
Official site

Women's Football Alliance teams
American football teams in Austin, Texas
American football teams established in 2001
2001 establishments in Texas